Colt CZ Group SE (formerly Česká zbrojovka Group - CZG) is a holding company for the Czech firearms and related industries based in Prague, Czech Republic. Its principal firearms brands are Česká zbrojovka (CZUB) CZ-USA and Colt.

In June 2020, the holding company listed its shares on the Prague Stock Exchange with a view of funding an expansion in the United States. The first trading took place in September of the same year.

On 11 February 2021 the company announced the acquisition of the Colt Holding Company, (the parent company to the Colt's Manufacturing Company) for Us$220 million, enabling the Czech gun maker's further expansion into the U.S. market. Česká zbrojovka Group reported the purchase complete on 24 May 2021., reflecting the move in renaming to Colt CZ Group SE on 12 April 2022.

The company's dividend policy estimates the level of an payout to the shareholders at a third of the company's net profit. In 2020 this constituted a payment of CZK 7.50 per single share, considerably increasing to CZK 25 per s/s in 2021.

References

External links 
 

Firearm manufacturers of the Czech Republic
2021 mergers and acquisitions
Manufacturing companies based in Prague